The Azerbaijani Soviet Encyclopedia (in Azerbaijani: Azərbaycan Sovet Ensiklopediyası, Cyrillic: Азәрбајҹан Совет Енсиклопедијасы,  or ) is a ten volume universal encyclopedia published in Baku, Azerbaijan from 1976 to 1987 by the Academy of Sciences of the Azerbaijan Soviet Socialist Republic. The editors-in-chief were Rasul Rza and Jemil Kuliyev. A special volume dedicated to Azerbaijan was scheduled to be published after the main ten volumes, but due to rising political problems and difficult economic situation, it has not been released. The complete set has been digitized and archived at the Internet Archive as of 2021.

List of volumes by publication date 

Volume I, 1976
Volume II, 1978
Volume III, 1979
Volume IV, 1980
Volume V, 1981
Volume VI, 1982
Volume VII, 1983
Volume VIII,1984
Volume IX, 1986
Volume X, 1987

See also
Great Soviet Encyclopedia
National Encyclopedia of Azerbaijan

References
 "Азәрбајҹан Совет Енсиклопедијасы (Azərbaycan Sovet Ensiklopediyası)" Azərbaycan Respublikası Prezidentinin İşlər İdarəsinin Prezident Kitabxanası 
"Азәрбајҹан Совет Енсиклопедијасы (Azərbaycan Sovet Ensiklopediyası)" Digitized and archived in the Internet Archive  

Azerbaijani-language encyclopedias
Azerbaijani encyclopedias
National Soviet encyclopedias
Azerbaijan Soviet Socialist Republic
Publishing companies of the Soviet Union
Publishing companies established in 1965
1965 establishments in Azerbaijan

20th-century encyclopedias